Peeping Tom spied on the Lady Godiva's naked ride.

Peeping Tom may also refer to:
 Peeping Tom, a nickname for a male voyeur
 Peeping Tom (1897 film), an American short comedy-drama film
 Peeping Tom (1960 film), a British horror film directed by Michael Powell
 Peeping Tom (1973 film), an American pornographic film directed by Ray Dennis Steckler
 Peeping Tom (band), a pop band formed by Mike Patton
 Peeping Tom (Peeping Tom album), 2000
 Peeping Tom (S.E.X. Appeal album), 1985)
 "Peeping Tom", a song by Toots and the Maytals from the 1970 album Monkey Man
 "Peeping Tom", a song by Placebo from the 2000 album Black Market Music
 "Peeping Tom", a song by Rockwell from the 1985 film The Last Dragon
 Peeping Tom (magazine), a British small press magazine
 Peeping Tom, a novel by Howard Jacobson centering on the work of Thomas Hardy
 Peeping Tom (theatre company), a Belgian dance theatre company